Githa Michiels (born 28 March 1983) is a Belgian cross-country cyclist. She placed 21st in the women's cross-country race at the 2016 Summer Olympics. She was on the start list of 2018 Cross-Country European Championships and finished 3rd..

References

External links
 

1983 births
Living people
Belgian female cyclists
Olympic cyclists of Belgium
Cyclists at the 2016 Summer Olympics
Cyclists at the 2020 Summer Olympics
Cyclists from Antwerp
21st-century Belgian women